Intelsat 603 or IS-603, previously named Intelsat VI F-3, is a communications satellite operated by Intelsat. Launched in 1990, it was the second of five Intelsat VI satellites to be launched. The Intelsat VI series was constructed by Hughes Aircraft, based on the HS-389 satellite bus.

Launch
Intelsat 603 was launched at 11:52:31 UTC on 14 March 1990, atop a Commercial Titan III carrier rocket, flight number CT-2, with an Orbus-21S upper stage. The launch took place from Launch Complex 40 at the Cape Canaveral Air Force Station, and was intended to place Intelsat 603 into a geosynchronous transfer orbit. The Orbus-21S failed to separate from the Titan's second stage, and as a result it was unable to fire, leaving Intelsat 603 in low Earth orbit.

Following the launch failure, Intelsat commissioned NASA to launch a replacement perigee motor to raise the satellite's orbit. During its maiden flight, STS-49, in 1992  rendezvoused with and captured Intelsat 603, and astronauts attached a new Orbus-21S to the satellite. This motor successfully raised the satellite into the planned transfer orbit.

The satellite raised itself into its final geostationary orbit using two liquid-fuelled R-4D-12 engines, with the satellite arriving in geostationary orbit on 21 May 1992.

Operations

Upon arrival in geostationary orbit, Intelsat 603 was placed at a longitude of 34.5 degrees west. It remained there until October 1997, when it was moved to 24.5 degrees west, arriving in November. In August 2002 it was relocated to 19.95 degrees west, where it operated until March 2010. Finally from May 2010 it operated at 11.5 degrees east until it was removed from geostationary orbit in January 2013.

Intelsat confirmed in February 2015 that Intelsat 603 had been retired to a graveyard orbit.

References

Intelsat satellites
Spacecraft launched in 1990
Spacecraft decommissioned in 2013
Spacecraft launched by Titan rockets
Derelict satellites orbiting Earth